Charis Charisis (born 12 January 1995) is a Greek professional footballer who plays as a midfielder for Turkish Süper Lig club Sivasspor.

Career

PAS Giannina
Born in Ioannina, Charisis began playing football with PAS Giannina. On 19 January 2014, he made his professional debut for PAS Giannina in a  match against Kalloni.

PAOK
Charisis will wear the jersey of PAOK from summer 2015 along with Nikos Korovesis. The two aces will be two of several acquisitions of PAOK in summer season. The players were about to sign to PAOK with the consent of the administration of PAS Giannina. According to absolutely reliable information is an agreement between the two major shareholders. Both are agreed on all the basics, with PAOK, but however nothing is announced yet.

On 25 June 2015, PAOK announced the acquisition of the player for four years for an undisclosed fee. On 25 October 2015, he made his Superleague debut with the club in a 3–1 home win against rivals Panathinaikos. On 10 January 2016, he scored his first goal against his hometown team PAS Giannina in a 3–0 home win game.

Loan to Sint-Truiden
On 26 June 2017, the details of Charisis borrowing to Belgian club Sint-Truiden are of interest as they prove that the deal is identical to what was done for Stelios Kitsiou. The borrowing comes with a €1.5 million purchase option and 20% resale.
On 2 December 2017, he scored his first goal with the club in an away 1–1 draw against Royal Excel Mouscron.
On 1 January 2018, he suffered a tear in the abductor muscle, following by a training deficit due to technical turf, that kept him out of the squad for almost 3 months.

Loan to Kortrijk
On 23 August 2018, Charisis will continue his career in Belgium as a loan from PAOK. The Belgian team announced the acquisition of the 24-year middlefielder, while retaining a purchase option for the summer of 2019.

Atromitos
On 24 June 2019, Charisis penned a two-year deal with the Peristeri-based club. Charisis, a versatile midfielder, shared his emotions from the move: “I am very happy to join the Atromitos family. This is a new challenge for me and I will do my best to prove that I can offer a lot to this team. I will help the team achieve its goals in both Greece and Europe. Tomorrow, I am looking forward to training with the team for the first time in front of our fans.”  Charisis has moved to Atromitos as a free agent after leaving PAOK.

On 7 June 2021, the club extended his contract for two more years, until 2023.

In the summer of 2022, Sivasspor made three official offers to acquire Charisis, but all of them were turned down by Atromitos.

Career statistics

Honours

Club
PAOK
Greek Cup: 2016–17

Individual
Super League Greece Best Young Player of the Year: 2014–15 - PAS Giannina
Super League Greece Best Young Player of the Year: 2015–16 - PAOK FC

References

External links
 
 
 

1995 births
Living people
Greek footballers
Greece under-21 international footballers
Greek expatriate footballers
Super League Greece players
Belgian Pro League players
Süper Lig players
PAOK FC players
PAS Giannina F.C. players
Sint-Truidense V.V. players
K.V. Kortrijk players
Atromitos F.C. players
Sivasspor footballers
Expatriate footballers in Belgium
Expatriate footballers in Turkey
Association football defenders
Footballers from Ioannina